Luteimonas lutimaris is yellow-pigmented, Gram-negative, strictly aerobic bacterium. Its type strain is G3(T) (= KACC 14929(T) = JCM 16916(T)).

References

Further reading
Whitman, William B., et al., eds. Bergey’s Manual® of Systematic Bacteriology. Vol. 2. Springer, 2012.

External links
LPSN
Type strain of Luteimonas lutimaris at BacDive -  the Bacterial Diversity Metadatabase

Xanthomonadales
Gram-negative bacteria
Bacteria described in 2011